Thilakam is a 1960 Indian Tamil-language drama film directed by Krishnan–Panju, produced by AVM Productions and written by K. M. Narayanasami. Based on Narayanasami's play of the same name, the film stars Prem Nazir and M. N. Rajam. It was released on 11 November 1960 and failed commercially.

Plot 

Saraswathi is a woman separated from her husband. She and her daughter Thilakam take refuge in her sister's family in Tiruchi. Saraswathi wants her daughter Thilakam to be married to her brother Sekhar. But her uncle Sambasivam wants to marry Thilakam to a rich but old man in Bombay. Sambasivam's son Gunasekharan is against this plan and wants Thilakam to be married to Sekhar. Whether he succeeds in this, forms the plot of the story.

Cast 
The details are adapted from The Hindu review article.

 Prem Nazir
 M. N. Rajam
 Sriranjani Jr.
 R. Rajakumari
 D. Balasubramaniam
V. K. Ramasamy
 Tambaram Lalitha
 "Kuladeivam" V. R. Rajagopal
 S. Rama Rao
 C. S. Pandian
 S. L. Narayanan
 Manorama
 "Appa" K. Duraiswami
 "Thilakam" K. M. Narayanasami
 Seethalakshmi
 Ramamani Bai
 Pakkirisami

Production 
Thilakam was a popular stage play written by K. M. Narayanasami. A. V. Meiyappan, the founder and then-owner of AVM Productions, bought the film rights to the play and produced the film. His son Saravanan started his film production career with this film working as a "production executive". Narayanasami wrote the film's dialogues.

Soundtrack 
Music was composed by R. Sudarsanam and the lyrics were penned by Kothamangalam Subbu, M. K. Athmanathan, A. Maruthakasi, Kavi S. Rajagopal and V. Seetharaman. The song "B-o-y Boy, Boyinna Paiyan, G – i – r – l Girl, Girlinna Ponnu" (based on the song "Cat Maane Billi" from the Hindi film Dilli Ka Thug), sung by S. C. Krishnan and Soolamangalam Rajalakshmi was a hit.

Partial List of Songs

Release and reception 
Thilakam was released on 11 November 1960. The Sunday Standard appreciated the plot, performances and cinematography. Kanthan of Kalki appreciated the dialogues, but criticised the story, performances and songs. The film was a commercial failure.

References

External links 

 

1960 drama films
1960 films
1960s Tamil-language films
AVM Productions films
Films directed by Krishnan–Panju
Films scored by R. Sudarsanam
Indian black-and-white films
Indian drama films
Indian films based on plays